The 1975 Pontins Professional was the second edition of the professional invitational snooker tournament which took place in May 1975 in Prestatyn, Wales.

The tournament featured eight professional players. The quarter-final and semi-final matches were contested over the best of 13 frames, and the final was the best of 19 frames.

Ray Reardon won the event, beating John Spencer 10–4 in the final.

Main draw

References

Pontins Professional
Snooker competitions in Wales
Pontins Professional
Pontins Professional
Pontins Professional